Ray Willets Washburne is an American businessman, political fundraiser, and government official. He served as President and CEO of the Overseas Private Investment Corporation from 2017 to 2019 and as a member of the President's Intelligence Advisory Board from 2019 to 2020.

Previously, he has served as an adjunct professor at Cox School of Business.

Early life and education
Washburne was born in Dallas, Texas in 1960, and was raised in Highland Park, later graduating from Southern Methodist University. In 1997 he married Heather Hill, a descendant of H. L. Hunt.

Business career
Washburne is a co-founder of the M Crowd Restaurant Group, owning forty-six restaurants, including the Mi Cocina and Taco Diner restaurant chains. He also has real-estate developments in several states and is the CEO of Charter Holdings. In 2009, Washburne and his family bought the Highland Park Village, an upscale shopping center in Dallas, for $170 million.

Washburne is currently the Chairman of the Board of Sunoco, LP. He is also a member of Council on Foreign Relations and a board member of SMU Cox School of Business Executive Committee.

Political fundraising
Washburne was actively involved in raising money for George W. Bush's presidential campaigns in both 2000 and 2004, and in the following years continued to raise money for the Republican Party. In 2011, he became finance chairman of Governor Tim Pawlenty bid for President. Later, in the 2012 presidential election, he backed Mitt Romney, the Republican Party's nominee, and became the campaign's Texas co-chair, while also raising money. Following the 2012 election, in which Romney was defeated, Washburne became the finance chairman of the Republican National Committee, during which he raised $160 million for the party.

In 2015, he became a part of Chris Christie's 2016 campaign for president, serving as the finance chairman. Christie subsequently conceded in the race, and after Donald Trump emerged as the Republican front-runner, Washburne raised money for Trump's campaign and became the vice chairman of the Trump Victory Committee, which acted as a bridge between the campaign and the RNC. After Trump's victory, he was the head on the Trump transition team for the Commerce Department.

In 2020, Washburne played a role in convincing Trump to call for restoring a tax break allowing corporations to fully deduct restaurant meal and entertainment costs.

Overseas Private Investment Corporation
On June 5, 2017, President Trump nominated Washburne as president of the Overseas Private Investment Corporation. The U.S. Senate confirmed him by voice vote on August 3, 2017. He worked to increase the OPIC's funding and activities despite the Trump administration's previous plans to shut down the agency. In 2018, Washburn led the effort to create the International Development Finance Corporation (DFC) which replaced OPIC with a merger of entities from USAID, State Department, and OPIC.

In February 2019, Washburne announced he would resign as OPIC's head on March 1.

President's Intelligence Advisory Board
In 2019, Washburne was appointed to the President's Intelligence Advisory Board.

US Military Southern Command
In 2019, Washburne was appointed to the advisory board of the US Military Southern Command.

Washburne Soccer & Track Stadium/SMU
In 2021, Washburne committed $5,000,000 to SMU to construct the new Washburne Soccer and Track Stadium. The facility has been recognized as one of the finest facilities for college soccer and completed the urban design of the campus.

Awards
 Commercial Real Estate Hall of Fame, 2023

References

External links
 Biography at OPIC

1960 births
Businesspeople from Texas
Date of birth missing (living people)
Donald Trump 2016 presidential campaign
Living people
Overseas Private Investment Corporation officials
People from Dallas
People from Highland Park, Texas
Texas Republicans
Trump administration personnel